The Juminkeko Foundation, or simply Juminkeko, is a Finnish organization founded in 1991. It runs Juminkeko, an eponymous information centre of the national epic Kalevala and Karelian culture located in Kuhmo, Finland. The centre was designed by the Finnish architects Mikko Heikkinen and Markku Komonen and was completed in 1999.

Activities 
The Juminkeko Foundation's purposes are to preserve the Kalevala-related cultural heritage and to promote cultural exchanges between Finland and the Republic of Karelia, Russia. The foundation organizes exhibitions and other events in Kuhmo and in other parts of Finland and the Republic of Karelia. Juminkeko’s activity also includes the publishing, the collection and filing of traditional material and the intervention for the revitalization of the so-called , famous for the  tradition. Juminkeko operates also as national cultural centre for children in the field of folk tradition.

For its core activities, the foundation is supported by the Ministry of Education and Culture. The support for other activities comes from several projects such as European Union projects, cooperation projects within neighbouring areas and projects funded by the Finnish Cultural Foundation.

Revitalization of the poetic villages of Viena 
Since 1990, the Juminkeko Foundation has been cooperating with the Karelian organization Arhippa Perttunen Foundation for the revitalization of the poetic villages of Viena.

This 30-year project's purpose is to preserve the threatened Viena culture. In 1993, the project for the revitalization of the poetic villages of Viena was recognized by UNESCO as part of the World Decade for Cultural Development.

From 1996 until 2001, Juminkeko successfully petitioned the World Monuments Watch to have Panozero village included in the list of the hundred most threatened cultural sites in the world. In 2005, Panozero received the medal Europa Nostra which is the highest European prize in the preservation of cultural heritage.

References

External links 
 
 Revitalization of the poetic villages of Viena
 Sommelo folk music festival website
 Runosong

Kalevala
Foundations based in Finland
Karelia
Karelian-Finnish folklore
Kuhmo
Cultural organisations based in Finland
Cultural promotion organizations